Ostrozhka is a rural locality (a selo) and the administrative center of Ostrozhskoye Rural Settlement, Okhansky District, Perm Krai, Russia. The population was 1,349 as of 2010. There are 32 streets.

Geography 
Ostrozhka is located 16 km southwest of Okhansk (the district's administrative centre) by road. Kasyanovo is the nearest rural locality.

References 

Rural localities in Perm Krai
Populated places in Okhansky District